Calathea zebrina, the zebra plant, is a species of plant in the family Marantaceae, native to southeastern Brazil. Under the synonym Goeppertia zebrina this plant has gained the Royal Horticultural Society's Award of Garden Merit.

Etymology
The Latin specific epithet zebrina means "with stripes like a zebra".

Description
The long stalks to  carry elliptical leaves  or more long. The leaves are dark green above, dark red below, the spines, veins and margins etched in lime green.

Cultivation
It is tender, with a minimum temperature of  required, and in temperate areas is cultivated indoors as a houseplant. Normal room temperature, that is around 20°C, is a suitable temperature for this plant all year round. It prefers a brightly-lit spot, but does not tolerate direct sun. The soil should be kept moist throughout the summer, when it cannot tolerate drought. Nutrition can be given every other week during the growing season from spring to fall, but no supplement during the winter. To give the blades a pleasant humidity, it can be showered with lukewarm water as often as possible. Replanting takes place when needed during the spring.

See also
Maranta leuconeura, a similar looking houseplant of the same family

References

zebrina
Flora of Brazil
House plants